Sir Horace (Horatio) Mann, 1st Baronet KB (8 August 1706 – 6 November 1786), was a long-standing British resident and diplomat in Florence.

Life and career
Mann was the second son of Robert Mann (1678–1751), a successful London merchant, and his wife, and Eleanor Guise Mann. He was baptised at St Martin's in the Fields, Middlesex, on 22 August 1706, brought up at Chelsea, and educated at Eton College and later, briefly, at Clare College, Cambridge. Suffering from poor health, he travelled on the continent in the 1730s.

In February 1737, he was appointed as secretary to Charles Fane, the British Minister at Florence. He then served as British diplomatic representative there to the Grand Dukes of Tuscany for the rest of his life.  

In the course of his long diplomatic career, he was Chargé d'affaires in 1738-1740; Minister between 1740 and 1765; Envoy Extraordinary from 1767; and finally Envoy Extraordinary and Plenipotentiary from 1782 until his death. 

As Great Britain had no diplomatic representation at Rome, Mann's duties included reporting on the activities of the exiled Stuarts, the Old Pretender and the Young Pretender.

Mann kept an open house for British visitors at Palazzo Manetti, Florence, inviting them for conversazione when there was no performance at the theatre. His generosity and kindness was well known,<ref>"he does honour to our nation. He lives elegantly and generously. He never fails in any point of civility and kindness to his countrymen. The politeness of his manners, and the prudence of his conduct, are shining examples both to the Britons and Italians. He is the only person I have ever known, whom all Englishmen agree in praising. He has the art of conquering our prejudices, and taming our fierceness." John Boyle, 5th Earl of Cork and Orrery, in Letters from Italy in the Years 1754 and 1755 (1773), pp. 107–108.</ref> although his close friendship with the painter Thomas Patch (expelled from Rome after a homosexual incident) reflected on his reputation. He met Horace Walpole (to whom he was distantly related) in 1739, and conducted a now-renowned correspondence with him over forty years, though they last met in 1741. The correspondence was published by Lord Dover in 1833.

In recognition of his service he was created a baronet on 3 March 1755. and made a Knight of the Bath on 26 October 1768. (when his nephew Horace stood proxy). In 1775, on the death of his elder brother, Edward Mann, Horace Mann inherited the Linton Park estate which his father had bought at Linton, Kent.

He died unmarried in Florence on 6 November 1786 and was buried in Linton on 17 February 1787. His nephew, Horace, inherited his baronetcy by special remainder and also acted as Chargé d'affaires until the arrival of his replacement.

 References 
Notes

Bibliography
Hugh Belsey, ‘Mann, Sir Horatio, first baronet (bap. 1706, d. 1786)’, Oxford Dictionary of National Biography'', Oxford University Press, Sept 2004; online edn, May 2009, accessed 1 Nov 2009

1706 births
1786 deaths
People educated at Eton College
Baronets in the Baronetage of Great Britain
Knights Companion of the Order of the Bath
Diplomats from Florence
British diplomats